The 2019 Road Race Showcase at Road America was a sports car race sanctioned by the International Motor Sports Association (IMSA). The race was held at Road America in Elkhart Lake, Wisconsin on August 4, 2019, as the ninth round of the 2019 WeatherTech SportsCar Championship, and the fifth round of the 2019 WeatherTech Sprint Cup.

Background
During this race weekend, IMSA holds their "State of the Series" annual press conference, in which they confirm and announce their future plans for the series they sanction.

Changes in balance of performance constraints before the race
On July 24, 2019, IMSA released a technical bulletin regarding the Balance of Performance for the race. The GT Le Mans (GTLM) balance of performance constraints would remain the same as they were in the previous event at Lime Rock Park. In the Daytona Prototype International (DPi) class, after winning the previous two events of the championship, the Mazda RT24-P was hit with a two-liter fuel capacity reduction and a power reduction of 17 horsepower and restriction in higher-RPM turbo boost, as well as being made 20 kilograms heavier. The Cadillac DPi-V.R was also made 20 kilograms heavier, but it received a 0.6 millimeter increase in its restrictor diameter, as well as an increase of 11 horsepower and a fuel capacity increase of one liter. The Acura ARX-05 was made 10 kilograms heavier. In the GT Daytona class (GTD), the constraints of the McLaren 720S GT3 were once again drastically improved, with a 30 kilogram weight reduction and a power increase of eight horsepower, and turbo boost increase. The Ferrari 488 GT3 was given improvements in the same fields, albeit smaller, along with a one liter fuel capacity increase. After winning the 6 Hours of the Glen and finishing 2nd in the previous two championship-scoring rounds, The Acura NSX GT3 was made 20 kilograms heavier.

Entries

On the same day as the Balance of Performance bulletin, the entry list for the event was released, featuring 35 cars. There were 10 entries in DPi, two in Le Mans Prototype (LMP2), eight cars in GTLM, and 15 cars in GTD. After suffering a heavy crash at the Mobil 1 SportsCar Grand Prix, Cadillac DPi customer team Juncos Racing decided not to take part in the Road America event, for not having built a new chassis in time. They were initially intending to take part in the race. After missing the previous two events, GTD team Starworks Motorsport are set to return for Road America, with their regular drivers Ryan Dalziel and Parker Chase. Porsche junior drivers Matt Campbell and Dennis Olsen will appear for Pfaff Motorsports and Wright Motorsports, respectively, after driving for the opposite teams in Lime Rock Park. In GTLM, Corvette Racing regular driver Tommy Milner will make his return after being substituted by endurance-only driver Marcel Fässler in the previous two races.

Qualifying 
Dane Cameron secured overall pole for the event.

Qualifying results 

  The No. 52 PR1/Mathiasen Motorsports entry had its two fastest laps deleted as penalty for causing a red flag during its qualifying session.

Results 

References

External links

Road America 500
Road America 500
Road America 500
Road America 500